Georgios Tzioumakas (born 23 January 1995) is a Greek male volleyball player. He is part of the Greece men's national volleyball team. On club level he plays for Foinikas Syros.

References

External links
 Georgios Tzioumakas at the International Volleyball Federation
 

1995 births
Living people
Greek men's volleyball players
Place of birth missing (living people)
Volleyball players from Thessaloniki